Marjorie S. "Marty" Moss-Coane (born February 14, 1949) is an American radio personality and executive.  She is the host and executive producer of Radio Times with Marty Moss-Coane, in Philadelphia. Moss-Coane has worked at WHYY-FM since 1983, when she began working as an associate producer on Fresh Air.  She became a host when Fresh Air went national in 1987.

Career 
Moss-Coane started her career at WHYY as a newsroom volunteer in 1980 and became a reporter in subsequent years. She joined the radio station after working as a school counselor and mental health professional. She began working on the show Fresh Air in the mid-1980s as an editor and assistant producer, but Terry Gross and co-executive producer Danny Miller encouraged her to try interviewing. On October 27, 1987, she started as the host of Radio Times, and has worked in that capacity ever since.

Moss-Coane is a graduate of Temple University.

References

1949 births
Living people
Temple University alumni
American radio personalities